, in more archaic context transliterated as  (abbreviated as ), anglicized as Tagmatarch, is used in the Greek language to mean "Major". More precisely, it means "commander of a ".

The rank dates to Antiquity and was also used in the Byzantine Empire. In this case they are addressed as "", or simply as "" in other cases.

References 

Hellenic Army officers
Military ranks of ancient Greece
Military ranks of Greece